Daesin-dong is a legal dong, neighbourhood of Seodaemun-gu in Seoul, South Korea and is governed by its administrative dong, Sinchon-dong's office.  National Route 48 runs through this neighbourhood, flanked by the nearby grounds of Yonsei University's Sinchon campus and Ewha Womans University.

See also 
Administrative divisions of South Korea

References

External links
 Seodaemun-gu Official site in English
 Map of Seodaemun-gu
 Seodaemun-gu Official website

Neighbourhoods of Seodaemun District